Anna & Bella is a 1984 Dutch animated short film from the Netherlands. At the 58th Academy Awards, Anna & Bella won an Oscar for Best Animated Short Film. The film runs 8 minutes. It was directed by Børge Ring, and its cast includes Tonny Huurdeman as the voices of Anna and of Bella.

Plot
This short film is about two elderly sisters looking through their memories of their lives together.

Reception and legacy
Animation critic Charles Solomon listed it as one of the best animated films of the 1980s a year after the Oscar win.

See also
1984 in film
Cinema of the Netherlands
1985 in film

References

Bibliography
 Olivier Cotte, 2007, Secrets of Oscar-winning animation: Behind the scenes of 13 classic short animations (Making of Anna & Bella), Focal Press. .

External links 
 
  (alternative link)
 

Films about memory
1984 films
1984 animated films
Animated films without speech
1980s animated short films
Best Animated Short Academy Award winners
Dutch animated short films
Films about the afterlife